"Rivals" is a song by American singer Usher, released as the fourth single for his eighth studio album, Hard II Love. The song features the vocal collaboration of American rapper Future. Usher co-wrote the song with Future, Kendricke Brown, Cameron Murphy, Paris Jones, and Carlos St John, while K-Major and Murphy Kid handled the song's production. It was released by RCA on August 30, 2016 for online streaming through the streaming service Tidal. It impacted US urban contemporary radio on September 13, 2016.

Music video
The music video for "Rivals" was filmed in Atlanta, Georgia. It was premiered on August 30, 2016 through the streaming service Tidal. The video featured cameo appearances from Keri Hilson, DJ Drama, Lil Uzi Vert and Swae Lee from Rae Sremmurd.

Charts

Weekly charts

Release history

References

2016 songs
2016 singles
RCA Records singles
Usher (musician) songs
Songs written by Usher (musician)
Future (rapper) songs
Songs written by Future (rapper)
Songs written by PJ (singer)